Hoseynabad-e Khani may refer to:
 Hoseynabad-e Khani, Arzuiyeh
 Hoseynabad-e Khani, Sirjan